St. John's Chapel, Del Monte is a parish of the Diocese of El Camino Real Episcopal Church in Monterey, California, founded in 1891.  Intended for guests at the Hotel Del Monte, the property was donated by railroad tycoon Charles Crocker.  St. John's Chapel is an example of an Episcopal church designed by architect Ernest Coxhead, with his shingle style architecture. The Chapel was listed on the National Register of Historic Places on October 21, 2020.

History

St. John's Chapel was originally built for guests staying at the Hotel Del Monte, part of the   resort built by the Big Four of railroad fame. Entrepreneur Charles Crocker donated the land for the chapel and his daughter Hattie Crocker Alexander and her future sister-in law, Emma Rutherford Crocker, were involved in the planning and construction of the chapel, begun in 1890. 

St. John’s Chapel, Del Monte is a Late Victorian Shingle Style, traditionally cross-shaped, single
story,  building with a 110-foot-high steeple and bell tower.

The chapel was dedicated on June 14, 1891, by Suffragan bishop the Rt. Rev. William Ford Nichols of the Diocese of California. The Shingle style architecture style chapel has an English cottage look. It was designed by Ernest Coxhead, an English-born architect, who designed and built churches and residences in California. It is an example of Coxhead's "idiosyncratic, dollhouse-style churches." Coxhead is often credited in helping to define the architectural term that has been referred to as the First Bay Tradition. Buildings are distinguished by sensitivity to their surroundings, use of natural materials—particularly redwood and shingles, and stone, plus employment of modern building methods and materials blended with historic details. The Shingle Style for which Coxhead was known refers to a building tradition characterized by the use of boards, siding and shingles for exterior walls.

In 1903, President Theodore Roosevelt worshiped at St. John's Chapel while staying at the Hotel del Monte. In the decades since, several movie stars were married at St. John's Chapel, including Brian Aherne and Joan Fontaine (1939) and Brooke Shield and Andre Agassi (1997). After the Naval Postgraduate School moved into the former Hotel del Monte, both naval and other military personnel, as well as locals and visitors, have provided new memberships.

In 1957, to make room for a newly planned state highway, it was necessary to move the chapel  to its present location on Mark Thomas Drive in Monterey. When the chapel was moved, an additional twenty feet were added to the west end of the nave and a narthex was added, designed by award-winning Architect, Robert Stanton. A memorial vestibule and front porch, added to the building in 1941, provided an additional  to the granite stairs.

See also
 Del Monte, Monterey, California
 Naval Postgraduate School
 List of Anglican churches
 St. John’s Episcopal Church
 National Register of Historic Places listings in Monterey County, California

References

External links 

 
 Monterey Peninsula The Golden Age

Episcopal church buildings in California
Buildings and structures in Monterey, California
Religious organizations established in 1891
Churches completed in 1891